CAMBRA is an acronym for Caries Management by Risk Assessment.  It describes a preventative form of dentistry in which patients are categorized by their relative risk for developing dental caries, based on risk factors including diet, oral hygiene, fluoride regiment, and past oral health history.

The CAMBRA system was developed as an evidence-based approach to the prevention, reversal, and treatment of patients with dental caries. The emphasis is on the whole disease process and employs the caries balance method, taking account of all factors that contribute to the development of dental caries (attacking factors) and all factors that research has shown to be protective from dental caries (defense factors). The assessment of this balance not only helps establish risk but suggests the correct strategies to prevent or reverse the process.
The CAMBRA system provides a more in-depth assessment tool as a key element of the overall approach and takes account of:
Caries disease indicators: Socio-economic status, developmental problems, and presence of lesions or restorations placed within the previous 3 years. 
Caries risk factors: Visible accumulations of plaque and quantitative assessment of Streptococcus mutans and Lactobacilli, frequent snacking, saliva flow and salivary modifying factors, fissure anatomy, root surface exposure, and the presence of appliances. 
Caries protective factors: Systemic and topical fluoride sources, adequate saliva flow, xylitol in the diet, use of calcium and phosphate paste or chlorhexidine. 
Clinical examination: Presence of white spots, decalcifications, restorations, plaque deposits. 
The tool assigns patients to low, moderate, high, or extreme risk and offers two formats, one for patients aged 0-5 years, and one for 6 years onward.
A key benefit of CAMBRA is that it forces both the dental professional and the patient (or their caregiver) to consider all the factors relevant to the patient’s risk and disease state, shifting the focus away from the traditional restorative approach of cavitation and restoration toward the cause of the disease and the need to modify the causes wherever possible. It also allows for greater communication and understanding between all members of the dental team.

References

Dentistry